Chakh Elmurzievich Akhriev was the first Ingush ethnographer and also a lawyer by education. Chakh dedicated his scholarly work to recording Ingush folklore, mythology, and culture as a whole.

Biography

Childhood
Born on May 10, 1850, in the village of Furtoug, Terek Oblast, in the family of Elmurza Akhriev, from the family of the Khamatkhanovs. By nationality he was Ingush, the Akhriev family will introduce its origin from the Ingush society of the Dzheyrakhites. In the family he had four older sisters.

From 1850 to 1860, the last period of the Caucasian War, came to an end in the region. During one of the military operations to "pacify" individual centers of resistance, 7-year-old Chakh Akhriev, along with other Ingush boys, was captured by a detachment of Russian troops and ended up in amanats (mountaineers-hostages, who, by their stay among the Russians, guaranteed loyalty to Russia). He was brought to the Vladikavkaz fortress, where he was sent to a military cantonist school (1857-1862). Thanks to the assistance of his uncle Temurko Akhriev, an officer in the Russian army, his position in Vladikavkaz was somewhat better than other hostage children, he was respected by the Russian authorities and had more freedom. He was adopted by the family of a Russian colonel who had no children of his own.

From 1862 to 1868, Chakh studied at the Stavropol gymnasium, within the walls of which a significant part of the Caucasian intelligentsia began their creative and scientific career. Many people from the Caucasus graduated from it, including the Ingush - S. Akhriev, A. Bazorkin, A.G. Dolgiev, I. Bekbuzarov, P. Dakhkilgov, K. Malsagov and others. During the 1860s to the 1870s, the historical and ethnographic study of the North Caucasus and Caucasian studies were encouraged in the Russian Empire, branches of All-Russian scientific societies were opened. During these years, fundamental studies of scientists A.P. Berger, P.G. Butkov, N.F. Dubrovin, D. Ya. Lavrov and others began to be published. Chakh Akhriev plunged into the world of Russian culture and was among the leading people of his time.

Early collecting period
After graduating from high school, due to illness he spent two years at home (1868-1870). During this period, he was engaged in the collection of folklore and ethnographic materials, which marked the beginning of his literary activity. Published in 1871–1873 in the "Collection of information about the Caucasian highlanders" (Tiflis) and the newspaper "Terskie vedomosti" (Vladikavkaz). He managed to visit various districts of the Terek Oblast, in particular, the Assinsky gorge and the Nazran district. His works, mainly of an ethnographic nature, present the testimonies of the elders of the mountain villages of Ingushetia, who not only personally witnessed the events and ceremonies of the Ingush culture of the 18th century, but also remembered stories about the life of their ancestors in the 17th century. Their words were used to describe the way of life, myths, legends, rituals, ancient religious cults, customary law, rituals, holidays and national legends of the Ingush and Chechen peoples. In addition, Chakh Akhriev was the first to describe the elements of the Nart epic of the Ingush, for example, he found that back in the 19th century, as a praise, the Ingush said: "Nart vo sannava iz" ("He is like a Nart!").

Later, the works of Chakh Akhriev were republished in the books Ingush (1996) and Chakh Akhriev. Favorites ”(2000). During his lifetime, scientists and scholars of caucasian culture, archaeologists, ethnographers, Russian lawyers F.I. Leontovich, B.K.Dalgat, M.M.Kovalevsky and others turned to the work of Chakh Akhriev. Dissertations are being written based on his materials.

From 1870 to 1874 he studied at the Nizhyn Lyceum, after which he was in unofficial exile for his Narodnaya Volya activity - he worked in various administrative bodies of the cities of Yevlakh and Nukh in the Elisavetpol province (now Azerbaijan). He actively advocated the compliance of the tsarist reforms with the interests of the Caucasian peoples and tried to influence the reforms of the Russian state. Because of his civic position, like another Ingush educator A-G. Dolgiev, he was “voluntarily expelled” and sent to the Transcaucasus for a long time. Long service activities and moving from city to city did not leave him the opportunity to devote himself to scientific and literary work.

Later life
On October 16, 1874, Chakh Akhriev was appointed a candidate for office positions at the Tiflis Court of Justice and for 8 years worked as a candidate for office position, assistant magistrate and forensic investigator. On November 24, 1882, he was appointed an agent for managing state property in the districts of the Elisavetpol province, and from January 31, 1889, he worked as an official on special assignments to supervise the populated lands and quitrent articles. Since May 27, 1897 - director of the Nukha branch of the committee of the custodian of prisons. From October 23, 1900, he worked as a junior overseer for the state lands and quitrent articles of the Elisavetpol province.

On September 28, 1912, he was dismissed for health reasons with the rank of collegiate counselor. He returned to Vladikavkaz, where he died on April 29, 1914, from diabetes mellitus. Buried in his native village Furtoug.

In the future, the study of the culture and socio-economic life of the region was continued by the Ingush scientists M. Bazorkin, AG. Dolgiev, A. Tutaev and others.

According to the memoirs of her daughter Nina Chakhovich, her father was a modest and sympathetic person, had a sociable and cheerful disposition. A large library was collected in the house of the Akhrievs, he subscribed to many newspapers and magazines. Favorite poet - N. A. Nekrasov.

Works 
Some of Chakh's works

 Funeral and commemoration at the highlanders. // "Collection of information about the Caucasian highlanders", Tiflis, 1870, no. II, pp. 28–32.
 A few words about the heroes in Ingush legends. // "Collection of information about the Caucasian highlanders", Tiflis, 1870, no. IV, dep. II, pp. 1–33.
 From Chechen legends // "Collection of information about the Caucasian highlanders", Tiflis, 1871, no. V, dep. II, § 2, pp. 38–46.
 Ingush holidays // "Collection of information about the Caucasian highlanders", Tiflis, 1871, no. V, dep. III, § 2, pp. 1–16.
 About Ingush porridges (family crypts of noble families). // "Terskie vedomosti". 1871, no. 17.
 The oath of the Ingush. // "Terskie vedomosti", 1871, no. 20.
 The moral meaning of the oath of the Ingush. // "Terskie vedomosti", 1871, No. 21.
 On the nature of the Ingush. // "Terskie vedomosti", 1871, no. 30.
 About Ingush women. // "Terskie vedomosti", 1871, No. 31.
 Ethnographic sketch of the Ingush people with the application of its tales and legends. // "Terskie vedomosti", 1872, No. 27-35, 39, 42, 43, 45–49; 1873, no. 3, 21, 22, 24–26.
 Ingush. Their legends, beliefs and beliefs. // "Collection of information about the Caucasian highlanders", 1875, no. VIII, dept. I, pp. 1–40.
 Notes about the Ingush ("On the character of the Ingush", "The oath of the Ingush", "On Ingush women", "Ingush porridges"). // "Collection of information about the Terek region", Vladikavkaz, 1878, no. 1, pp. 276–290.

Legacy 
The Ingush Research Institute of the Humanities is named in honor of Chakh Akhriev  . In 2005, Ch. E. Akhriev was posthumously awarded the Order of Merit "for outstanding services in the field of ethnography and many years of scientific activity"

Chakh Akhriev along with other early Chechen-Ingush ethnographers such as Umalat Laudaev contributed to the preservation of Chechen-Ingush fairy tales, customs and mythology. Their works are still in use today, the Caucasian historian Amjad Jaimoukha referenced Akhriev's work in his own works on the Caucasus.

References

Ingush people
1850 births
1916 deaths
Lawyers from the Russian Empire
Ethnographers from the Russian Empire